Dispensationalism is a theological system of interpreting the Bible that was first espoused by John Nelson Darby. Dispensationalism maintains that history is divided into multiple ages or "dispensations" in which God acts with humanity in different ways. Dispensationalists generally maintain beliefs in premillennialism, a future restoration of Israel, and a rapture that will happen before the second coming, generally seen as happening before the tribulation. The term "dispensationalism" itself was coined by a critic of the system, Philip Mauro, in 1926.

Theology

Progressive revelation

Progressive revelation is the doctrine in some forms of Christianity that each successive book of the Bible provides further revelation of God and his program. For instance, the theologian Charles Hodge wrote:

The New Testament writings, then, contain additional information regarding God and his program beyond the writings of the Old Testament.

Disagreement exists between covenant theology and dispensationalism regarding the meaning of revelation. Covenant theology views the New Testament as the key to interpreting the Old Testament. Therefore, concepts such as the biblical covenants and promises to Israel are believed to be interpreted by the New Testament as applying to the church.

Dispensationalism holds that both the Old Testament and New Testament are interpreted using literal grammatical-historical interpretation. As a result, they reject the idea that the meaning of the Old Testament was hidden and that the New Testament can alter the straightforward meaning of the Old Testament. Their view of progressive revelation is that the New Testament contains new information which can build on the Old Testament but cannot change its meaning.

Distinction between Israel and the Church
Dispensationalists profess that there exists a historic and demographic distinction between Israel and the Christian Church. For dispensationalists, Israel is an ethnic nation consisting of Hebrews (Israelites), beginning with Abraham. The Church, on the other hand, consists of all saved individuals in this present dispensation—i.e., from the "birth of the Church" in Acts until the time of the rapture. According to progressive dispensationalism in contrast to the older forms, the distinction between Israel and the Church is not mutually exclusive, as there is a recognized overlap between the two. The overlap includes Jewish Christians like James, brother of Jesus, who integrated Jesus' teachings into the Jewish faith, and Christians of Jewish ethnicity who held varying opinions on compliance with Mosaic law, like Saint Peter and Paul the Apostle.

Classical dispensationalists refer to the present-day Church as a "parenthesis" or temporary interlude in the progress of Israel's prophesied history. Progressive dispensationalism "softens" the Church/Israel distinction by seeing some Old Testament promises as expanded by the New Testament to include the Church. However, progressives never view this expansion as replacing promises to its original audience, Israel. Dispensationalists believe that Israel as a nation will embrace Jesus as their messiah toward the end of the Great Tribulation, right before the Second Coming.

Start of the Church Age 
Classic dispensationalism began with John Nelson Darby. Darby was succeeded by the theologian C. I. Scofield, the Bible teacher Harry A. Ironside, Lewis Sperry Chafer, William R. Newell, and Miles J. Stanford, each of whom identified Pentecost (Acts 2) with the start of the Church as distinct from Israel; this may be referred to as the "Acts 2" position. Other Acts 2 Pauline dispensationalists include R. B. Shiflet, Roy A. Huebner, and Carol Berubee.

In contrast, Grace Movement Dispensationalists believe that the church started later in Acts and emphasize the beginning of the church with the ministry of Paul. Advocates of this "mid-Acts" position identify the start of the church occurring between the salvation of Saul in Acts 9 and the Holy Spirit's commissioning of Paul in Acts 13.

The "Acts 28" position posits that the church began in Acts chapter 28 where the Apostle Paul quotes Isaiah 6:9-10 concerning the blindness of Israel, announcing that the salvation of God is sent to the Gentile world (Acts 28:28).

Premillennial dispensationalism 
Premillennial dispensationalists affirm a future, literal 1,000-year reign of Jesus Christ (Revelation 20:6), which merges with and continues on to the eternal state in the "new heavens and the new earth" (Revelation 21). They claim that the millennial kingdom will be theocratic in nature and not mainly soteriological, as it is considered by George Eldon Ladd and others with a non-dispensational form of premillennialism.

The vast majority of dispensationalists profess a pretribulation rapture, with small minorities professing to either a mid-tribulation, or post-tribulation rapture.

Dispensations 
The number of dispensations vary typically from three to eight. The typical seven-dispensation scheme is as follows:
 Innocence — Adam under probation prior to the Fall of Man. Ends with expulsion from the Garden of Eden in Genesis 3. Some refer to this period as the Adamic period or the dispensation of the Adamic covenant or Adamic law.
 Conscience — From the Fall to the Great Flood. Ends with the worldwide deluge.
 Human Government — After the Great Flood, humanity is responsible to enact the death penalty.  Ends with the dispersion at the Tower of Babel. Some use the term Noahide law in reference to this period of dispensation.
 Promise — From Abraham to Moses. Ends with the refusal to enter Canaan and the 40 years of unbelief in the wilderness. Some use the terms Abrahamic law or Abrahamic covenant in reference to this period of dispensation.
 Law — From Moses to the crucifixion of Jesus Christ. Ends with the scattering of Israel in AD70. Some use the term Mosaic law in reference to this period of dispensation.
 Grace — From the cross to the rapture of the church seen by some groups as being present in 1 Thessalonians and the Book of Revelation. The rapture is followed by wrath of God constituting the Great Tribulation. Some use the term Age of Grace or the Church Age for this dispensation.
 Millennial Kingdom — A 1000 year reign of Christ on earth, centered in Jerusalem, ending with God's judgment on the final rebellion.

Below is a table comparing the various dispensational schemes:

History

Early Church 
Dispensationalists authors have quoted Papias of Hierapolis for embracing premillennialism in the 2nd century.

Pseudo-Ephraim said that all believers will be gathered to the Lord prior to the tribulation, but it is debated what he meant by the statement and if he had a pretribulational view. The Apocalypse of Elijah mentions believers being "taken up upon their wings and lifted up before his wrath".

Forerunners 
Advocates of Dispensationalism have sought to find similar views of dispensations in Church history, referencing theologians or groups such as Francisco Ribera, the Taborites, Joachim of Fiore and others. Joachim's theory of three stages of human history has been argued to have anticipated the later dispensationalist view of organizing history into different dispensations. Fra Dolcino also taught Fiore's theory of the stages of history, but he was said to have taught that his followers would be taken away or raptured prior to the tribulation, after which God will send Enoch and Elijah to the Earth.

Edward Irving in some ways anticipated dispensationalism, but he also had many differences.

John Edwards (1637-1716) divided history into multiple dispensations, including the millennium. 

William C. Watson argued that multiple 17th century theologians anticipated dispensational views, he argued that Ephraim Huit and John Birchensa in his "The History of Scripture" published in 1660 taught that God has differing plans for Jews and Gentiles. He also argued that Nathaniel Holmes taught a pretribulational rapture.

Pierre Poiret 
Pierre Poiret wrote a book called "The Divine Economy", this work had multiple similarities to dispensationalism. Poiret has been said to have been the first theologian to develop a Dispensationalist system. He taught that history should be organized into multiple dispensations in which God works with humans in different ways, including the millennium as a future dispensation. Pierre also held that in the future the Jews will convert into Christianity and in a future restoration of national Israel.

Poiret divided history into  7 dispensations:

 Early childhood (ended in the Flood)
 Childhood (ended in Moses' ministry)
 Boyhood (ended in Malachi)
 Youth (ended in Christ)
 Manhood (Most of the Church)
 Old age ("human decay", meaning the last hour of the Church)
 The restoration of all things (The Millennium, includes Christ literally reigning on the Earth with Israel restored)

19th century 
Dispensationalism developed as a system from the teachings of John Nelson Darby, considered by some to be the father of dispensationalism (1800–82), who strongly influenced the Plymouth Brethren of the 1830s in Ireland and England. The original concept came when Darby considered the implications of Isaiah 32 for Israel. He saw that prophecy required a future fulfillment and realization of Israel's kingdom. The New Testament church was seen as a separate program not related to that kingdom. Thus arose a prophetic earthly kingdom program for Israel and a separate "mystery" heavenly program for the church. In order to not conflate the two programs, the prophetic program had to be put on hold to allow for the church to come into existence. Then it is necessary for the church to be raptured away before prophecy can resume its earthly program for Israel.

In Darby's conception of dispensations, the Mosaic dispensation continues as a divine administration over earth up until the return of Christ. The church, being a heavenly designated assembly, does not have its own dispensation as per Scofield. Darby conceives of dispensations relating exclusively to the divine government of the earth and thus the church is not associated with any dispensations.

While his Brethren ecclesiology failed to catch on in America, his eschatological doctrine became widely popular in the United States, especially among Baptists and Old School Presbyterians.

United States
Dispensationalism was adopted, modified, and made popular in the United States by the Scofield Reference Bible.
It was introduced to North America by James Inglis (1813–72) through the monthly magazine Waymarks in the Wilderness, published intermittently between 1854 and 1872. During 1866, Inglis organized the Believers' Meeting for Bible Study, which introduced dispensationalist ideas to a small but influential circle of American evangelicals. They were disturbed by the inroads of religious liberalism and saw premillennialism as an answer. Dispensationalism was introduced as a premillennial position, and it largely took over the fundamentalist movement, over a period of several decades. The American church denominations rejected Darby's ecclesiology but accepted his eschatology. Many of these churches were Presbyterian and Baptist, and they retained Darby's Calvinistic soteriology.

After Inglis' death, James H. Brookes (1830–98), the pastor of Walnut Street Presbyterian Church in St. Louis, organized the Niagara Bible Conference (1876–97) to continue the dissemination of dispensationalist ideas. Dispensationalism was boosted after Dwight L. Moody (1837–1899) learned of dispensational theology from an unidentified member of the Brethren during 1872. Moody worked with Brookes and other dispensationalists and encouraged the spread of dispensationalism. The efforts of C.I. Scofield and his associates introduced dispensationalism to a wider audience in America by his Scofield Reference Bible. The publication of the Scofield Reference Bible during 1909 by the Oxford University Press for the first time displayed overtly dispensationalist notes on the pages of the biblical text. The Scofield Bible became a popular Bible used by independent Evangelicals in the United States. Evangelist and Bible teacher Lewis Sperry Chafer (1871–1952) was influenced by Scofield; he founded the Dallas Theological Seminary during 1924, which has become the main institution of dispensationalism in America. The Baptist Bible Seminary in Clarks Summit, Pennsylvania became another dispensational school. Grace School of Theology opened in Houston, TX in 2003 as a dispensational school. Founded by graduates of Dallas Theological Seminary, it holds "that the Bible must be interpreted as language is normally used, recognizing the importance of dispensational distinctions."

Other prominent dispensationalists include Reuben Archer Torrey (1856–1928), James M. Gray (1851–1925), William J. Erdman (1833–1923), A. C. Dixon (1854–1925), A. J. Gordon (1836–95), and William Eugene Blackstone, author of the book Jesus is Coming (endorsed by Torrey and Erdman). These men were active evangelists who promoted a host of Bible conferences and other missionary and evangelistic efforts. They also gave the dispensationalist philosophy institutional permanence by assuming leadership of new independent Bible institutes, such as the Moody Bible Institute during 1886, the Bible Institute of Los Angeles (now Biola University) during 1908, and Philadelphia College of Bible (now Cairn University, formerly Philadelphia Biblical University) during 1913. The network of related institutes that soon developed became the nucleus for the spread of American dispensationalism.

Dispensationalism has become very popular with American evangelicalism, especially among nondenominational Bible churches, Baptists, Pentecostal, and Charismatic groups. Conversely, Protestant denominations that embrace covenant theology as a whole tend to reject dispensationalism. For example, the General Assembly of the Presbyterian Church in the United States (PCUS) (which subsequently merged with the United Presbyterian Church in the United States of America (UPCUSA), in which dispensationalism existed) termed it "evil and subversive" and regarded it as a heresy. The Churches of Christ underwent division during the 1930s as Robert Henry Boll (who taught a variant of the dispensational philosophy) and Foy E. Wallace (representing the amillennial stance) disputed severely over eschatology.

Influence

United States politics
Israel has allied with U.S. evangelicals and dispensationalists to influence U.S. foreign policy, including protection of the Jewish people in Israel and continued aid for the state of Israel. Israel's alliance with televangelist John Hagee began in the early 1980s as he met with every Prime Minister of Israel since Menachem Begin. Since the mid-2000s Israel has been in commercial alliance with televangelist and sometime-politician Pat Robertson.

Political commentator Kevin Phillips claimed in American Theocracy (2006) that dispensationalist and other fundamentalist Christians, together with the oil lobby, provided political assistance for the invasion of Iraq during 2003.

Nancy LeTourneau of Washington Monthly has called dispensationalist theology "a somewhat twisted form of anti-semitism", remarking, "None of this will end well for the Jewish people, or the rest of us."

See also
 British Israelism
 Christian eschatology
 Hyperdispensationalism
 Law of Christ
 Millennial Day Theory
 Progressive revelation (Baháʼí)
 Whore of Babylon

References

Further reading
 Allis, Oswald T. Prophecy and the Church (Presbyterian & Reformed, 1945; reprint: Wipf & Stock, 2001). 
 Bass, Clarence B. Backgrounds to Dispensationalism (Baker Books, 1960) 
 Berubee, Carol. A Case for Pauline Dispensationalism: Defining Paul's Gospel and Mission (Blue Dromos Books, 2017) 
Boyer, Paul. When Time Shall Be No More: Prophecy Belief in Modern American Culture (Belknap, 1994) 
 Clouse, Robert G., ed. The Millennium: Four Views (InterVarsity, 1977) 
 Enns, Paul. The Moody Handbook of Theology (Moody, 1989) 
 Gerstner, John H.  Wrongly Dividing the Word of Truth: A Critique of Dispensationalism.  Third edition.  Nicene Council, 2009.  
 Grenz, Stanley. The Millennial Maze (InterVarsity, 1992) 
 LaHaye, Tim, and Jerry B. Jenkins. Are We Living in the End Times? (Tyndale House, 1999) 
 Mangum, R. Todd, The Dispensational-Covenantal Rift (Wipf & Stock, 2007) 
Mangum, R. Todd and Mark Sweetnam, "The Scofield Bible: Its History and Impact on the Evangelical Church" (Colorado Springs: Paternoster Publishing, 2009) 
 McDonald, Marci The Armageddon Factor:The Rise of Christian Nationalism in Canada (Random House Canada, 2010) 
 Phillips, Kevin American Theocracy: The Peril and Politics of Radical Religion, Oil, and Borrowed Money in the 21st Century (Viking Adult, 2006) 
 Poythress, Vern. Understanding Dispensationalists (P&R Publishing 2nd ed., 1993) 
 Ryrie, Charles C. Dispensationalism (Moody, 1995) 
 Ryrie, Charles C. Basic Theology (Moody, 1999) 
 Showers, Renald (1990). "There Really Is a Difference: A Comparison of Covenant and Dispensational Theology." Friends of Israel Gospel Ministry. 
 Sutton, Matthew Avery. American Apocalypse: A History of Modern Evangelicalism. Harvard University Press. 
 Sweetnam, Mark The Dispensations: God's Plan for the Ages (Scripture Teaching Library, 2013) 
 Underwood, Grant. (1999) [1993]. The Millenarian World of Early Mormonism. Urbana: University of Illinois Press. 
 Walvoord, John. The Millennial Kingdom (Zondervan, 1983) 
 Walvoord, John F. Prophecy In The New Millennium (Kregel Publications, 2001)

External links
 O'Hair, J. C. The Unsearchable Riches of Christ

Premillennialism
Christian fundamentalism
Christian terminology
Christian theological movements
Time in religion